Rodić is a Serbo-Croatian surname. Notable people with the surname include:

 Aleksander Rodić (born 1979), Slovenian football player
 Gabriel Rodić (1812–1890), Croatian general in the Austrian Empire
 Ivan Rafael Rodić, Croatian Franciscan priest, Archbishop of Belgrade
 Ivan Rodić, Croatian football player
 Milan Rodić, Serbian football player
 Silvio Rodić, Croatian football player
 Snežana Rodić, Slovenian triple jumper
 Vladimir Rodić, Montenegrin football player

Croatian surnames
Serbian surnames
Slavic-language surnames
Patronymic surnames